Bolderwood is an area of the New Forest in Hampshire.  Bolderwood hosts a deer sanctuary with a public deer observation platform.  As a result, the public car park at Bolderwood is the most visited in the New Forest. From here the Bolderwood Arboretum Ornamental Drive links to the A35 passing close to the Knightwood Oak, one of the largest trees in the New Forest. A nearby feature is the Portuguese Fireplace.

External links

 Forestry England website for Bolderwood 
New Forest Community Media - A not-for-profit media site serving the National Park

New Forest